Associated Foods Holdings, also referred to as Associated Food Stores, Associated Supermarkets or Associated, is the largest group of independently operated supermarkets based in the New York metropolitan area. Associated Supermarkets provide services to a network of approximately 250 independent grocery retail stores, many located in New York City. The company also has stores on Long Island, in Upstate New York, New Jersey, Connecticut, Massachusetts, Rhode Island, North Carolina, South Carolina, Pennsylvania, and Virginia. Associated is a banner of Associated Supermarket Group (ASG).  Other banners include Compare, Met Foods and Pioneer Supermarkets. Both Associated and Compare banners are known to cater to multicultural demographics. Associated and all sister banner stores carry mainstream, ethnic, natural, and organic products and its private label Avenue A.

History
Associated Food Stores began as Queens Food Dealers in 1954, a few years after Associated Food Stores' (AFS) founder, Sol Chalek, operated a small grocery in Queens near the end of the era of the Great Depression.  Mr. Chalek bought the store from a grocer who found it necessary to sell, owing to the Depression and his inability to financially maintain the store.  Mr. Chalek had no prior knowledge of the grocery business, but worked hard and diligently at his new career, learning as he went along.  He soon found that he was working an excessive number of hours just to keep food on his own family's table. Large chains, such as the Atlantic & Pacific Tea Co. (A&P) could buy in bulk and therefore offer their groceries less expensively, while small grocers had to pay full wholesale prices and their profit margins were meager.  It was soon apparent that if other small grocers like himself could purchase goods at lower prices by forming a buyers' group, they might all work fewer hours and make a profit.  He endeavored to find a location that would be suitable for a meeting, though he had no idea how many independent grocers might attend.  Always confident, he was able to rent for one night a large room in Astoria, Queens, New York City, owned by the Steinway Piano Company, and located on the top floor of their factory.  He composed a flyer and had 800 copies printed, which he and a few others distributed to all the grocers in both Brooklyn and Queens, and, to his surprise, a majority of the grocers in those boroughs attended the meeting.  They agreed to form a cooperative purchasing group, which could buy their goods under one entity at lower prices from the manufacturers.  They rented warehouse space in south Queens, and rented an office for their newly formed company, Queens Food Dealers, with Sol Chalek as the head of the group. Members, including Chalek, continued to operate their stores as independent manager/proprietors, but were now offered prices from wholesalers that were closer to what the larger chain operations paid.  Things continued to improve for the grocers, but new chains began to invade the NYC area, and such competition was all at once threatening the gains the grocers had made.  In the 1940s, with World War II raging, and both Sol Chalek's sons, Al and Morton, off fighting in the skies over Europe and North Africa in the Army Air Corps, the proprietors approached Mr. Chalek and decided that they would sell his store to someone who agreed to be a member, and Sol Chalek would no longer have a store, but function solely as the head of this new company, Queens Food Dealers.  In time, warehouse space was insufficient as more retailers joined the group.  Mr. Chalek, in conjunction with other officers of the company and the many members of the co-op decided to form a corporation, Associated Food Stores (AFS) and build a warehouse and office complex at 179-45 Brinkerhoff Avenue, in Jamaica, Queens, replete with a loading dock that was served by a stretch of railroad track.  They could now receive rail cars full of product and store it in their new, much larger warehouse.  They decided that the butcher business within most of the stores would be concessions, but hired an expert to run the meat department of the corporation, which distributed the meat to those concessions within the member Associated Food Stores.  Soon, they were maintaining large amounts of grocery, dairy and even candling their own private label eggs.  While most of the stores were neighborhood size groceries, members began to build larger supermarkets on Long Island and other locations in the tri-state, metropolitan area, and at this time the stores numbered approximately 260 stores.

As supermarket chains grew larger and larger in the late 1950s and 1960s, it grew increasingly difficult to compete in the New York City environs, and Mr. Chalek hired a CEO away from Hills Supermarkets, a much larger chain, and not a cooperative.  His name was Eric Steinberg.  It was hoped that Mr. Steinberg, owing to his experience at the helm of a large chain, would improve things.  It did not work.  Under Steinberg's leadership the corporation lost over $12 million in the first year.  It is unclear whether Steinberg's mistakes, if any, were the death knell for the company, but soon one by one, members opted out of their membership with Associated, and began to pull their distribution from other distributors.  Some went to other urban chains, such as Met Foods and Pioneer, and some remained, only to see the corporation fall into Chapter 11. It was bought by the Maidenbaum family in the mid-1970s. After its purchase in the 70s the banner has passed through several acquisitions to its current history. 

Most recent timeline of events:

 In March 2012, AUA Private Equity Partners, a New York-based firm, acquired Associated Food Stores.

 In January 2014, Associated added the Met Foodmarkets and Pioneer Supermarkets banners to its portfolio. Both Met Foods and Pioneer Supermarkets are recognized brands that have served and continue to serve the NYC marketplace for many years.

 In 2015, Associated Food Stores officially became Associated Supermarket Group (ASG).

 In January 2021, AUA sold Associated Supermarket Group sold to ASG senior management.

References

External links 
 
Associated Supermarket Group (ASG) Headquarters
Compare Foods
Met Foodmarkets
Pioneer Supermarkets

Retailers' cooperatives in the United States
American companies established in 1954
Retail companies established in 1954
Supermarkets of the United States
Companies based in New York City
1954 establishments in New York City